Borucino may refer to the following places:
Borucino, Greater Poland Voivodeship (west-central Poland)
Borucino, Pomeranian Voivodeship (north Poland)
Borucino, West Pomeranian Voivodeship (north-west Poland)